Bouchercon is an annual convention of creators and devotees of mystery and detective fiction. It is named in honour of writer, reviewer, and editor Anthony Boucher; also the inspiration for the Anthony Awards, which have been issued at the convention since 1986. This page details Bouchercon XLVII and the 2016 Anthony Awards ceremony.

Bouchercon 
The convention was held at New Orleans, LA from 15–18 September 2016. The event was chaired by Connie Perry and Heather Graham.

Special guests 
 Lifetime Achievement: David Morrell
 American Guests of Honor: Harlan Coben
 Bouchercon Kids Guest of Honor:  R. L. Stine
 International Rising Star Guest of Honor: Craig Robertson
 Toastmasters: Harley Jane Kozak and Alexandra Sokoloff
 Local Legend: Julie Smith
 Fan Guests of Honor: Jon and Ruth Jordan
 The David Thompson Memorial Special Service Award: Otto Penzler

Anthony Awards 
The following list details the awards distributed at the 2016 annual Anthony Awards ceremony.

Best Novel 
Winner:
 Chris Holm, The Killing Kind
Shortlist:
 Matt Coyle, Night Tremors
 Catriona McPherson, The Child Garden
 Louise Penny, The Nature of the Beast
 Hank Phillippi Ryan, What You See

Best First Novel 
Winner:
 Glen Erik Hamilton, Past Crimes
Shortlist:
 Patricia Abbott, Concrete Angel
 Rob Hart, New Yorked
 Brian Panowich, Bull Mountain
 Art Taylor, On the Road with Del & Louise

Best Paperback Original 
Winner:
 Lou Berney, The Long and Faraway Gone
Shortlist:
 Adrian McKinty, Gun Street Girl
 Lori Rader-Day, Little Pretty Things
 Josh Stallings, Young Americans
 James W. Ziskin, Stone Cold Dead

Best Critical Non-fiction Work 
Winner:
 Val McDermid, Forensics: What Bugs, Burns, Prints, DNA, and More Tell Us About Crime
Shortlist:
 Martin Edwards, The Golden Age of Murder: The Mystery of the Writers Who Invented the Modern Detective Story
 Suzanne Marrs & Tom Nolan, Meanwhile There Are Letters: The Correspondence of Eudora Welty and Ross Macdonald
 Nathan Ward, The Lost Detective: Becoming Dashiell Hammett
 Kate White, The Mystery Writers of America Cookbook: Wickedly Good Meals and Desserts to Die For

Best Short Story 
Winner:
 Megan Abbott, “The Little Men: A Bibliomystery”
Shortlist:
 Hilary Davidson, “The Siege” from Ellery Queen Mystery Magazine, Dec 2015
 Brace Godfrey/Johnny Shaw, “Feliz Navidead” from Thuglit Presents: Cruel Yule
 Erin Mitchell, “Old Hands” from Dark City Lights
 Travis Richardson, “Quack and Dwight” from Jewish Noir
 Holly West, “Don't Fear the Ripper” from Protectors 2: Heroes

Best Anthology or Collection 
Winner:
 Art Taylor, Murder Under the Oaks: Bouchercon Anthology 2015
Shortlist:
 Christopher Irvin, Safe Inside the Violence
 Thomas Pluck, Protectors 2: Heroes-Stories to Benefit PROTECT
 Todd Robinson, Thuglit Presents: Cruel Yule: Holiday Tales of Crime for People on the Naughty List
 Kenneth Wishnia, Jewish Noir: Contemporary Tales of Crime and Other Dark Deeds

Best Young Adult Novel 
Winner:
 Joelle Charbonneau, Need
Shortlist:
 Owen Matthews, How to Win at High School
 Mindy McGinnis, A Madness So Discreet
 Melinda Salisbury, The Sin Eater’s Daughter 
 B.K. Stevens, Fighting Chance
 Henry Turner, Ask the Dark

Best Crime Fiction Audio-book 
Winner:
 Robert Bathurst (narrator), The Nature of the Beast by Louise Penny
Shortlist:
 Assaf Cohen (narrator), Dark Waters by Chris Goff
 Clare Corbett, Louise Brealey & India Fisher (narrators), The Girl on the Train by Paula Hawkins
 Christina Cox (narrator), Causing Chaos by Deborah J. Ledford
 Em Eldridge (narrator), Young Americans by Josh Stallings

External links 
 Official Website

References 

Anthony Awards
47